Graustark is a 1915 American silent adventure drama film produced by the Essanay Studios. It is based on the novel Graustark by George Barr McCutcheon. The film starred romantic team Francis X. Bushman and Beverly Bayne and proved one of their most popular vehicles. Fred E. Wright directed the film.

The film was remade in 1925 as Graustark with Norma Talmadge. The 1923 Fox film Truxton King with John Gilbert is based on one of the sequels.

Cast
Francis X. Bushman as Grenfall Lorry
Beverly Bayne as Princess Yetive
Edna Mayo as Countess Dagmar
Thomas Commerford as Uncle Caspar
Helen Dunbar as Aunt Yvonne
Alan Roscoe as Harry Anguish
Lester Cuneo as Prince Gabriel
Bryant Washburn as Prince Lorenz
Ernest Maupain as Prince Bolarez

See also
Francis X. Bushman filmography

Preservation status
Prints of Graustark are preserved in the George Eastman House Motion Picture Collection and the EYE Film Institute Netherlands.

References

External links

1915 films
American silent feature films
Essanay Studios films
Films based on American novels
American black-and-white films
American adventure drama films
Films set in Europe
1910s adventure drama films
1915 drama films
1910s American films
Silent American drama films
Silent adventure drama films
1910s English-language films